Baskerville Holmes (May 5, 1964 – March 18, 1997) was an American professional basketball player from Memphis, Tennessee, who was selected in the 1986 NBA Draft with the 68th (3rd round) pick by the Milwaukee Bucks.  His unique name was given to him by his mother, who was inspired by Sherlock Holmes and Sir Arthur Conan Doyle's crime novel The Hound of the Baskervilles. He was a Tennessee state high school champion in the high jump.

Career 
A 6'7" (2.01 m) power forward, Holmes played for four seasons at Memphis State University from 1982 to 1986 wearing #43.  While with the Tigers, Holmes (along with William Bedford and Keith Lee) formed a very powerful and productive front court. In 1986, Holmes was drafted into the National Basketball Association by the Milwaukee Bucks but never played for them. He played professional basketball in Finland, Spain and Sweden, before returning to Memphis where he became a truck driver.

Death 
In March 1997, Holmes, who was believed to have suffered from drug addiction and depression, had an argument with his girlfriend of six years and shot her dead.  Sometime after (on the same day) Holmes then killed himself.  Before he died, he told the brother of his girlfriend that the situation had been an accident.

References

External links 
 'I got so much on my mind, I don't know what to do' – ESPN.com feature
 Memphis (State) Tigers basketball rosters
 Holmes statistics

1964 births
1997 suicides
African-American basketball players
American expatriate basketball people in Finland
American expatriate basketball people in Spain
American expatriate basketball people in Sweden
American male high jumpers
Basketball players from Memphis, Tennessee
Memphis Tigers men's basketball players
Milwaukee Bucks draft picks
Murder–suicides in the United States
Power forwards (basketball)
Shooting guards
American men's basketball players
20th-century African-American sportspeople